The Maysville and Lexington Railroad, Southern Division, was a 19th- and early 20th-century railway company in north-central Kentucky in the United States. In 1868, along with the Northern Division, it restored the service of the earlier Maysville & Lexington line, which had failed in 1856. The Southern Division was more successful than the Northern, which failed in 1875 and was reörganized as the "North Division". The Southern line survived until 1921, when it and the North Division were purchased by the L&N.

The Southern Division's routes and rights-of-way are today owned by CSX Transportation.

See also
 Maysville and Lexington Railroad, the predecessor line
 List of Kentucky railroads

Defunct Kentucky railroads
Defunct companies based in Kentucky
Railway companies established in 1868
Railway companies disestablished in 1921
1868 establishments in Kentucky
1921 disestablishments in Kentucky
American companies disestablished in 1921